The Botanical Gardens of Tirana is a scenic botanical gardens complex located in southern Tirana, Albania. 

 It is the only botanical gardens complex in Albania. Construction commenced in 1964, with the original site covering approximately 15 hectares. It was completed in 1971. 
It is situated towards the south of the city and is overlooked by the Tirana and Kruja mountains.

The Botanic Garden of Tirana, which is part of the University of Tirana, has become institutionalised with international links with Canadian, Hungarian, Chinese and Romanian gardens.

The garden contains around 2,000 species of plants and is maintained by horticultural experts and scientists who also use the gardens for study purposes. The Gardens are part of Botanic Gardens Conservation International.

Current areas of study include the ecology of introduced plant species, the threatened endemic species and other areas of study are concentrated in the phytosociological study of the black pine, oak and natural pasture lands.

See also
List of botanical gardens

References

Tourist attractions in Tirana
1964 establishments in Albania
Tirana
Parks in Tirana